Gil Haskell (born September 24, 1943) is a former American football coach.  A long-time assistant coach in the National Football League (NFL), he served as the offensive coordinator for the Seattle Seahawks from 2000 to 2008. He began his career in the NFL as a ball boy with the San Francisco 49ers while his uncle, William O'Grady, was a part owner of the franchise.  Haskell grew up in St. Brendan's Parish in  San Francisco and graduated from St. Ignatius College Preparatory in 1961. He played college football played at San Francisco State University and then was head coach at St. Ignatius from 1973 to 1977. Haskell then left for University of Southern California (USC), spending five seasons there as an assistant coach. He broke into the NFL as a coach in 1983 with the Los Angeles Rams, coaching special teams, running backs and tight ends for nine seasons. In 1992, he joined the Green Bay Packers where he became part of Mike Holmgren's staff for the first time as a running back coach and wide receiver coach. When Holmgren left Green Bay for the Seattle Seahawks in 1998, Haskell accepted the offensive coordinator position with the Carolina Panthers. In 2000, he reunited with Holmgren in Seattle in the same role. He has indicated that he would like to be a head coach in the NFL and even launched a low key campaign for the Oakland Raiders position when the Raiders fired Norv Turner after the 2005 season. That position was eventually filled with the hiring of Art Shell.

On February 10, 2010 the Cleveland Browns announced that Haskell as the senior advisor to president Mike Holmgren.

Haskell and his late wife, Nancy, have four daughters: Paula, Patty, Jenny and Julie.

NFC Championship Game injury
In the 1995 NFC Championship game between the Packers and the Dallas Cowboys, Haskell was involved in a sideline collision where he was knocked backward and hit the back of his head against the carpet-covered concrete sideline of Dallas' Texas Stadium. Haskell was unresponsive for five minutes before he started to move, and was carted off in an ambulance. The impact of Haskell's head was enough to fracture the back of his skull and cause a contusion in the front of his brain. He was able to fully recover and was discharged from the hospital after less than 2 weeks.

References

1943 births
Living people
Carolina Panthers coaches
Green Bay Packers coaches
Los Angeles Rams coaches
National Football League offensive coordinators
Seattle Seahawks coaches
San Francisco State Gators football players
USC Trojans football coaches
High school football coaches in California
Players of American football from San Francisco